Zainab Khawla (born 23 December 1969) is a Syrian politician. She is an Independent member of the Syrian Parliament representing Aleppo.

References 

Living people
1969 births
21st-century Syrian women politicians
Members of the People's Assembly of Syria
Independent politicians in Syria
21st-century Syrian politicians